The First Shehbaz Sharif provincial cabinet was formed by Shehbaz Sharif in 1997 to begin a new government following the 1997 Pakistani general election.

Cabinet

Ministers
Following were the members of cabinet:
 Brig (Retd) Zulfiqar Ahmed Dhilloun (PP-134 – Sheikhupura) - PML(N) -  Education
 Ch Muhammad Afzal Sahi (PP-54 – Faisalabad) - PML(N) -  Communication & Works (1998-1999)
 Ch Muhammad Iqbal (PP-85 – Gujranwala) - PML(N)-  Irrigation & Power
 Ch Muhammad Riaz (PP-10 – Rawalpindi) - PML(N) -  Cooperatives
 Ch Shaukat Dawood (PP-239 – Rahim Yar Khan) - PML(N) -  Revenue
 Muhammad Iqbal Khan Khakwani (PP-160 – Multan) - PML(N) -  Food
 Haji Irfan Ahmed Khan Daha (PP-177 – Khanewal) - PML(N) -  Transport
 Malik Saleem Iqbal (PP-19 – Chakwal) - PML(N) -  Forest, Fisheries, Wildlife and Tourism
 Mian Meraj Din (PP-120 – Lahore) - PML(N)-  Excise & Taxation
 Ijaz Ahmed Sheikh (PP-102 – Sialkot) - PML(N) -  Labour and Manpower
 Muhammad Arshad Khan Lodhi (PP-182 – Sahiwal) - PML(N) -  Industries & Mineral Development
 Muhammad Basharat Raja (PP-4 – Rawalpindi) - PML(N) - Law & Parliamentary Affairs (Additional Charge – Information, Culture and Youth Affairs)
 Pir Syed Muhammad Binyamin Rizvi (PP-99 – Mandi Baha-ud-Din) - PML(N) - Social Welfare, Women Development and Bait-ul-Maal
 Raja Ishfaq Sarwar (PP-8 – Rawalpindi) - PML(N) -  Health 
 Rana Muhammad Iqbal Khan (PP-149 – Kasur) - PML(N) - Livestock & Dairy Development
 Sahibzada Haji Muhammad Fazal Karim (PP-56 – Faisalabad) - PML(N) -  
Auqaf
 Sardar Zulfiqar Ali Khan Khosa (PP-201 – D.G. Khan) - PML(N)-  Communication & Works
 Syed Afzaal Ali Shah Gillani (PP-158 – Okara) - PML(N) -  Housing & Physical Planning

References

1997 establishments in Pakistan
Shehbaz Sharif
Cabinets established in 1997
1990s in Pakistan
1990s in politics
Cabinets disestablished in 1999
Punjab, Pakistan ministries